Incheh-ye Olya (also Romanized as Īncheh-ye ‘Olyā; also known as Īncheh-ye Bālā, Incha, Īncheh, and Lencheh) is a village in Jeyransu Rural District, in the Central District of Maneh and Samalqan County, North Khorasan Province, Iran. At the 2006 census, its population was 1,059, in 306 families.

References 

Populated places in Maneh and Samalqan County